TC Mouras is a stock car racing series in Argentina which is operated by the Asociación Corredores de Turismo Carretera. This series was founded in 2004 as a division of TC Pista, being called as TC Pista B and located as the opening series of Turismo Carretera. After the initial championship, won by Luis Esteban Hernández, the ACTC recategorized the TC Pista B as a school category for those drivers who wish to compete at the national level in the TC Pista, their competitions being organized mainly at the Autódromo Roberto José Mouras (La Plata). For this reason, the series was renamed TC Mouras, the name being a combination of the acronym of the higher category and the surname of the driver Roberto Mouras who gave the name to the circuit.

Between 2011 and 2018, special races were held in which each TC Mouras titular driver invited another driver, who added points for the titular driver. In turn, there was a championship for these guest drivers.

Champions

Guest Driver Championships

References

Auto racing series in Argentina
Stock car racing series
Asociación Corredores de Turismo Carretera
2004 establishments in Argentina
Recurring sporting events established in 2004